The Adnyamathanha are a contemporary Aboriginal Australian people of the northern Flinders Ranges, South Australia, formed as an aggregate of several distinct peoples. Strictly speaking the ethnonym Adnyamathanha was an alternative name for the Wailpi, but the grouping also includes the Guyani, Jadliaura, Pilatapa and sometimes the Barngarla peoples. The origin of the name is in the words "adnya" ("rock") and "matha" ("group" or "group of people").

Adnyamathanha is also often used as the name of their traditional language, although the language is more commonly called "yura ngarwala" by Adnyamathanha people themselves (roughly translated as "our speech"), and they refer to themselves as "yura". There is a community of Adnyamathanha people at Nepabunna, just west of the Gammon Ranges, which was established as a mission station in 1931. The Adnyamathanha people have run Nantawarrina IPA, the first Indigenous Protected Area in Australia, since 1998.

Country
According to David Horton's map "Aboriginal Australia" (largely based on that of Norman Tindale), the Adnyamathanha lands lie on the west banks of Lake Frome and extend south and west over the northern Ikara-Flinders Ranges National Park and northwards over the Vulkathunha-Gammon Ranges National Park. The people today describe their lands as "from the Northern Flinders south to Port Augusta and as far east as Broken Hill".

On the northern edges of the Adnyamathanha tribal lands are the Diyari lands, on the western edges are the Kokatha lands. To the south are the Barngarla (also sometimes included in the Adnyamathanya group), Nukunu, and Ngadjuri. To the east are the Malyangapa.

On 30 March 2009, the Adnyamathanha people were recognised by the Federal Court of Australia as having native title rights over about  running east from the edge of Lake Torrens, through the northern Flinders Ranges, approaching the South Australian border with New South Wales.

Nantawarrina, the first Indigenous Protected Area in Australia, was established in 1998, with extensive work done by Indigenous rangers to restore the land and protect the native flora and fauna since then.

In 2016 Ikara-Flinders Ranges National Park was renamed from Flinders Ranges National Park in recognition of its Adnyamathanha heritage. The word ikara means "meeting place" in Adnyamathanha language, and refers in this instance to Wilpena Pound (situated within the park), a traditional meeting place of the Adnyamathanha people.

People
The ethnonym Adnyamathanha was, according to Tindale, an alternative name for the Wailpi, but the grouping also includes the Guyani (Kuyani), Jadliaura (Yardliyawara), Pilatapa, and, according to the people themselves, the Pangkala (Barngarla) peoples.

The name Adnyamathanha means "rock people", with "adnya" meaning "rock" and "matha", a "group" or "group of people", in the Adnyamathanha language, and is a term referring to the Lakes Culture societies living in that area. They share a common identity, which they get from their ancestors; this common bond is their language and culture which is known as Yura Muda. Adnyamathanha people often refer to themselves as "yura", and non-Aboriginal people as "udnyu".

Language

Adnyamathanha is a member of the Thura-Yura language family and the only one which still has fluent native speakers.

Mythology and astronomy

The origins of the Adnyamathanha are told through creation stories, passed down from generation to generation. The primordial creator figure of the rainbow serpent is, among them, known as akurra.

The Pleiades (Seven Sisters) are known to them as the Makara, seen as a group of marsupial-like women with pouches, while the Magellanic Clouds are known as Vutha Varkla, seen as two male lawmen also known as the Vaalnapa.

Traditionally, the Adnyamathanha bear strong respect for lizards such as geckoes and goannas. This is explained in myth as the cannibal sun goddess Bila having been defeated by the Lizard Men Kudnu and Muda.

History of contact

In 1851 the first Europeans settled some of the Adnyamathanha land. This led to many conflicts because the Adnyamathanha people were pushed off their land by the Europeans, who lived on pastoral leases established by the state government. In response to the loss of their land, food and water, Aboriginal people stole sheep, which in turn led to retaliatory killings. However, Aboriginal stockmen and housekeepers soon became a way of life for the early settlers, and the Adnyamathanha people adopted western dress and ways by the 1900s.

They nevertheless retained strong links to their language and culture, and would gather at the campsite and ration depot at Mount Serle Station (Atuwarapanha), a significant cultural site to speak in their languages and pass on their lore. After rations stopped, they relocated to Ram Paddock Gate (Minerawuta) during the 1920s. After the Nepabunna Mission was established by the United Aborigines Mission in 1931, most of the residents of Ram Paddock moved there. Some of the mission residents worked at R. M. Williams's workshop nearby, where Williams developed his trademark boots and horse-riding equipment, helping to build his business in the first two years of its existence.

Records of culture
A University of Adelaide anthropological expedition travelled to Nepabunna in May 1937 led by J.B. Cleland, which included Charles P. Mountford as ethnologist and photographer, as well as botanist Thomas Harvey Johnston, virologist Frank Fenner, and others. Mountford was especially interested in the Adnyamathanha people's art, mythology and rituals. He came back later in the year and many times thereafter, recording Adnyamathanha language and culture. The Mountford-Sheard Collection in the State Library of South Australia (inscribed in UNESCO's Memory of the World programme in 2008 ) shows that he had intended to write a book about them, but this was never realised. However the library has a large collection of handwritten journals, photographs, sound and film recordings gathered by him from and about the people. Mountford was self-taught, but had been in the field recording Australian rock art sites during the 1920s with Tindale, and was sympathetic to the plight of Aboriginal people.

Adnyamathanha flag
In 2011 a flag of the Adnyamathanha people was created, and raised at Nepabunna on the 80th anniversary of its establishment. At the time, there was one remaining person still alive who had been born on the mission, Ronald Coulthard.

Exhibition
An exhibition entitled UNSETTLED: Colonial Ruin in the Flinders Ranges, described as "a critical examination of settler-colonial nostalgia in the Flinders Ranges, within an artistic context", was mounted by the State Library of South Australia in partnership with the Adnyamathanha Traditional Lands Association in March–May 2017. It included many photographs by Mountford, taken by him on the 1937 and subsequent trips to the Flinders. The photos were complemented by story-telling by descendants of the people represented, including Terrence Coulthard (see Notable people, below).

Notable people

 Adam Goodes, four-time All-Australian AFL footballer, stated he is an Adnyamathanha and Narungga man.
 Rebecca Richards, the first Aboriginal Rhodes Scholar, is an Adnyamathanha and Barngarla woman.
 Regina McKenzie is an artist who, in 2006, had two pieces acquired by the National Museum of Australia of Adnyamathanha Dreaming Storylines and who, in 2016, was awarded the Peter Rawlinson award for her outstanding contribution to protection of country by the Australian Conservation Foundation.
 Juanella McKenzie, artist and daughter of Regina McKenzie, had two works (containing similar storylines subject matter) acquired by the National Museum of Australia in 2008, and in early 2019 at the age of 29, Juanella was acquired into the National Museum of Scotland with a bark painting she did using traditional methods depicting women's business. She won an Achievement award from TAFE NSW in 2019, a category of the Gili (pronounced kill-ee) Awards which celebrate the achievements of Aboriginal students, as well as the accomplishments of TAFE NSW employees and innovative programs that have empowered Aboriginal and Torres Strait Islander communities. She won Country Arts SA’s 2020 Breaking Ground visual arts development award, and her work Yurndu (Sun) which uses the traditional technique of weaving emu feathers, was selected as a finalist for the Ramsay Art Prize at the Art Gallery of South Australia in 2021.
 Terrence and Josephine Coulthard, authors of the first Adnyamathanha/English bilingual dictionary, published in November 2020. The family runs the Iga Warta cultural tourism enterprise, near Nepabunna.

See also
 List of Indigenous Australian group names
 Nepabunna, South Australia
 Adnyamathanha language

Notes

Citations

Sources

Further reading

Aboriginal peoples of South Australia
Flinders Ranges